Anomatic Corporation manufactures aluminum products, and is a manufacturer of large-quantity aluminum parts for cosmetic companies' packaging including Revlon, Maybelline, Estee Lauder and Mary Kay.

History
Since 1965, Anomatic has been manufacturing items ranging from consumer products such as MP3 players, cookware, and baseball bats to industrial applications such as heat sinks and aerospace/aviation components.

Product lines 
The company produces anodized aluminum packaging for the personal care, makeup, fragrance, automotive, pharmaceutical, health and beauty industries for clients as well as industrial applications.  It is headquartered in New Albany, Ohio with additional US manufacturing locations in Newark, Ohio, Connecticut, and an international facility in Suzhou, China.  Anomatic’s services include package design, rapid 3D prototyping, metal forming, anodizing, decorating, assembly, and metallization.

Specializing in high-volume runs, Anomatic is known as the "color experts" for its highly-consistent anodizing process and color matching capabilities. Now vertically-integrated, Anomatic has reinvested to add multiple additional decorative technologies as well as metallization in-house, making the company one of the only metallizing manufacturers in the US to supply the cosmetics industry.

Environmental policies
Anomatic is committed to being environmentally responsible. The company has implemented a sustainability plan to reduce energy, waste, water and air pollution as well as recycle and reuse materials. In 2010, Anomatic announced the formation of the Sustainability and Environmental Operations Group which works to expand the company’s sustainable and green operations through Lean, Six Sigma and GMP. The company opened its LEED-certified facility in New Albany, Ohio within the International Personal Care and Beauty Campus and moved its headquarters there.

References

External links
 Official website

Manufacturing companies based in Ohio
Manufacturing companies established in 1966
1966 establishments in Ohio